Nalbariya dialect is a dialect of Assamese language spoken primarily in and around the Nalbari district of Assam.  It is one of three of the Kamrupi group of dialects—the others being Barpetia dialect and Palasbariya dialect.

Phonology 

Nalbariya has seven vowels, identical to Barpetia dialect, and almost identical to Standard Assamese, which has an additional vowel.

Notes

References

 

Assamese language